This was the first edition of the tournament.

Caroline Dolehide won the title, defeating Ann Li in the final, 6–3, 7–5.

Seeds

Draw

Finals

Top half

Bottom half

References

External Links
Main Draw

Thoreau Tennis Open - Singles
Tennis in Massachusetts